The West End Street Railway was a streetcar company that operated in Boston, Massachusetts and several surrounding communities in the late nineteenth century.

Originally an offshoot of a land development venture, the West End rose to prominence when it merged several independent streetcar companies into a single organization, and over the next decade it was the primary operator of public street transit within the Boston area. During this time, the company maintained one of the largest street railway systems in the world, the first unified streetcar system in the United States, and first electrified system in a major US city.

The West End remained in independent operation until 1897, when it leased its entire line to the Boston Elevated Railway. It was formally consolidated into the Boston Elevated in 1922.

History

Foundation
The original purpose of the West End was to provide service to a speculative land venture in western Boston and Brookline. In the mid-1880s a syndicate of investors led by Henry Melville Whitney chartered the West End Land Company and purchased some five million square feet of land in Brookline along the line of a proposed boulevard, with the intent of developing the tracts into a high-grade residential neighborhood. In conjunction with the development plans, Whitney proposed to create the boulevard as an extension of Beacon Street from Boston, with two wide roadways and a central reservation for a future street railway line. Approval for the boulevard was granted by a Brookline town meeting in March 1887, and construction was commenced that same year.

In order to build and operate the railway line, Whitney and the syndicate chartered the West End Street Railway on January 22, 1887. The West End also secured other locations in Brookline, and before long both it and a sister organization, the Suburban Street Railway, were granted locations in Boston to provide connections with the lines of other streetcar companies operating in the city.

Consolidation

At the time of the West End's formation, horsecar service in the Boston area was divided between several independent railway companies, with the four principal ones being the Metropolitan, the Cambridge, the Consolidated, and the South Boston. Each of these principal railways enjoyed a virtual monopoly in a particular area of the metro (with the Metropolitan being dominant in lower, western & East Boston, the Cambridge in the area of Cambridge, the Consolidated in Charlestown and lower Middlesex County, and the South Boston in the South Boston peninsula), from which they would transport passengers to a series of several shared terminuses within the central city.

Originally, the West End intended to coordinate operations with the principal companies in order to gain access to the Boston downtown; these efforts were however stymied by the directors of the Metropolitan and the Cambridge, who feared that the new organization represented a threat to their interests. Whitney and his associates therefore decided to carry out a much more ambitious strategy, in which they would acquire a majority of the stock of each of the established railways and unite them under common ownership. Within a short time they were able to achieve a controlling interest in all four of the principal companies, and in June 1887 the Massachusetts state legislature granted the West End a dispensation to unite with any other streetcar company operating in Boston. After some more months of negotiations, consolidation was completed in November 1887, in which shareholders of the four companies turned in their existing shares and in exchange received varying amounts of West End 8% preferred stock.

As a result of the consolidation, the West End was transformed into one of the largest street railway companies in the world, bringing some two hundred miles of track under single ownership. The move also created the first unified public transit system in a major American city, with nearly all streetcar service in Boston (excepting that of the Lynn and Boston) being operated by the company as a result. In the first ten months following consolidation the company reported a rider count of 85 million, while in its first full year of operations (FY 1888-89) the system carried over 104 million passengers.

Initial public reaction to consolidation was mixed, with detractors raising concerns that it would set the stage for the creation of a monopoly. For their part, proponents argued that the move would put an end to the inefficiencies of having competing railways (which had been held to blame for high levels of congestion and blockades on the streets of Boston), and a general improvement in service would be achieved as a result. In remarks made to stockholders shortly after the merger, Whitney himself defended consolidation on the grounds that "the blockades occurring on the principal thoroughfares" in Boston had reached the point of requiring a remedy, and that "if [the West End] had not taken hold of this matter the city would surely have done something [instead]."

Electrification

Following the completion of consolidation, the West End began to pursue the possibility of electrifying the system in order to improve performance and cut operating costs. To assess the practicality of mechanization, Whitney and general manager Daniel Longstreet made exploratory visits to several cities including Richmond, Virginia, where Frank Sprague had recently developed the first practical electric trolley line in the country. The success of the Richmond system convinced Whitney and Longstreet of the benefits of electrification, and the West End soon afterwards contracted with Sprague to build an experimental line in Boston.

At first, the company experimented with both overhead lines and ground-level conduits for power, but the latter was quickly abandoned when found to be impractical. After conducting test runs in late 1888, a line running between Boston and Brookline was opened on the first day of 1889, while a second line to Cambridge commenced operations on February 16. Within a few months the company was prepared to make electrification general and a contract was executed with the Thomson-Houston Electric Company to equip the entire West End system. The conversion inspired Oliver Wendell Holmes Sr.'s 1891 poem The Broomstick Train, or The Return of the Witches, in which he imagined the streetcars being propelled by the Salem witches with their broomsticks as the trolley poles. Horsecars would stop at any point upon passenger request, which became impractical with increased service; as lines were electrified, the West End designated stopping points with white-painted bands on poles.

By the end of 1892, electric trolleys accounted for two-thirds of total car mileage, while by 1894 they constituted over ninety percent of the total. Just five horsecar routes remained by the end of 1895. By the time the final pair (on Marlborough Street in the Back Bay) were discontinued on December 24, 1900, the only other horsecar operation in the state was a short line at Onset.

Elevated railway and subway proposals

One of the largest challenges facing the West End during its history was in dealing with a massive rise in passenger usage, which resulted in ever-increasing levels of congestion on Boston city streets during the 1880s and 1890s. At first the management of the West End were slow in their efforts to address the issue, but in order to head off potential competition from rival companies they eventually offered several proposals for establishing rapid transit lines to relieve traffic within the city.

Initially, the West End attempted to build an elevated railway to provide rapid transit into central Boston. In July 1890 the state legislature passed a measure authorizing the company to construct elevated railroads, and three months later Whitney unveiled a plan for a main line running between Roxbury and Charlestown. In December of that year, however, preliminary work on the line was halted in the face of opposition by various parties, and from there the project eventually stalled out. Other proposals for the West End, including a highly controversial idea for a rail running through the Boston Common, were similarly never carried out, and ultimately no elevated or dedicated lines were put into place by the company.

Another idea for reducing congestion, a subway or tunnel line, was considered by the West End as early as 1887, but over the next few years it was unable to develop a serious workable proposal on this front. By the mid-1890s it was decided that the issue was best left to the state and local authorities to handle, and eventually the Boston Transit Commission was designated to build a subway for trolley cars running underneath Tremont Street in central Boston. In December 1896 the West End signed an agreement with the Transit Commission to lease the tunnel, known as the Tremont Street Subway (now the central part of the Green Line), for a period of twenty years upon completion. Under the terms of the lease, the company was to pay 4.875% per year on the lesser of $7,000,000 or the actual cost of the tunnel, with additional compensation to be owed based on volume of use.

During this period, Whitney stepped down as president in September 1893 and was replaced with Samuel Little, a former organizer and treasurer of the Highland Street Railway.

Lease to the Boston Elevated
In 1894, the Boston Elevated Railway was incorporated with a charter to develop a system of rapid transit routes within the greater Boston area. Among the group of investors in the new company was Josiah V. Meigs, the inventor of an experimental steam-powered monorail known as the Meigs Elevated Railway. The charter enabled the company to construct an elevated railway based either on the Meigs plan or an alternate approved design, but excluded any designs that were based on the existing Manhattan system in use in New York City.

Within a year of Boston Elevated's incorporation, the group behind it realized that they would be unable to raise sufficient capital to develop their proposed railway, and attempted to sell their charter off to a variety of parties, including the West End. The directors of the West End, however, considered the charter to be incompatible with their interests, in part due to the perceived impracticality of the Meigs system and the prohibition on emulating the Manhattan design. The board accordingly turned down an offer to acquire the Boston Elevated for $150,000, preferring instead to focus on existing operations and prepare for the upcoming opening of the subway.

The rejection of the purchase provoked disagreement among the shareholders of the West End, and a faction of investors who were in favor of the elevated railway system decided to take action against the board's decision. The group, which included Eben Dyer Jordan and William Bancroft and which was financially backed by Kidder, Peabody & Co. and J.P. Morgan, quickly acquired a controlling interest in the Boston Elevated and attempted to do the same with the West End. Following a highly-publicized proxy fight, the Kidder-Morgan faction managed to gain control of the board at the annual shareholders' meeting in November 1896, and a short time afterwards plans were formed to lease the West End system to the Boston Elevated on a long-term basis.

In June 1897, the state legislature authorized the lines and property of the West End to be leased to and operated by the Boston Elevated. The initial lease was initially for a 99-year term, under which shareholders of West End common stock would receive a fixed annual dividend of 8%. After this proposal was rejected by the Massachusetts Board of Railroad Commissioners in November 1897, the term was shortened to 25 years and the dividend rate was reduced to 7%. The modified lease was approved by the shareholders of the West End on December 9, 1897, and ratification by the board of railroad commissioners was received on December 18.

Later history

In 1900, Samuel Little resigned as president and was succeeded by Joseph B. Russell.

In 1911, the stage legislature authorized the purchase and merger of the West End by the Boston Elevated upon the expiration of the lease term. Upon the event of merger, holders of preferred and common stock in the West End would exchange their shares at par for an equal amount of stock in the Boston Elevated.

The company was formally consolidated into the Boston Elevated on June 10, 1922.

Summary statistics

The above excludes passenger numbers from free transfer passengers, as well as miles run by/revenue from U.S. Mail cars.

Notes

References

External links

Massachusetts Bay Transportation Authority
Streetcars in the Boston area
Tram, urban railway and trolley companies
Defunct Massachusetts railroads
Rail transportation in Boston